Morice Fredrick "Tex" Winter (February 25, 1922 – October 10, 2018) was an American basketball coach and innovator of the triangle offense. He was a head coach in college basketball for 30 years before becoming an assistant coach in the National Basketball Association (NBA). He was an assistant 
to Phil Jackson on nine NBA championship teams with the Chicago Bulls and the Los Angeles Lakers. Winter was inducted to the Naismith Memorial Basketball Hall of Fame in 2011.

Early life
Winter was born near Wellington, Texas (a fact which later provided him with his nickname when his family moved to California) 15 minutes after twin sister Mona Francis. The Winter family moved to Lubbock, Texas in 1929, where his mechanic father died of an infection when Tex was ten years old. Winter had to work while in elementary school to help his family, one such job was to collect boxes for a local baker in exchange for day-old bread. In 1936, Winter and his sister moved to Huntington Park, California with their mother, who would work as a clothing store sales manager. His older football star brother Ernest remained in Texas to finish high school while his older sister Elizabeth had already married and moved to California first and encouraged them to move there. While attending Huntington Park High School, Winter worked with Phil Woolpert and Pete Newell as a ball boy for Loyola University.

After graduation from high school in 1940, Winter attended college at Compton Junior College for two years, where he became a renowned pole vaulter and earned a scholarship to Oregon State University. He was on the basketball and track teams at both schools.  As a pole vaulter, Winter competed against Bob Richards, a 1948 and 1952 Olympian. He was considered a strong candidate for the US Olympic team in 1944, but the Olympics were cancelled by World War II.

Winter met his wife Nancy at Oregon State. Both of them entered the United States Navy in early 1943, with Winter going into fighter pilot training and his wife into WAVES. After his pilot's wings were conferred he was assigned to fighter pilot duty in the Pacific. However, his orders were rescinded after his brother's plane was shot down, and Winter remained at Naval Air Station Glenview in Illinois for the duration of the war.  After the war, he was assigned to NAS Corpus Christi as a test pilot for an experimental jet craft. While in the navy, Winter was a starting guard for his basketball team under the commanding officer Chuck Taylor.  He left the Navy with the rank of Ensign in 1946.

Winter returned to college after the war at the University of Southern California, where he learned the triangle offense from his coach Sam Barry. At USC, Winter became an All-American pole vaulter and was a teammate of Bill Sharman, Alex Hannum, and Gene Rock, future professional basketball players.

College coaching career
After graduating college in 1947, Winter immediately entered the coaching profession as an assistant to Hall-of-Famer Jack Gardner at Kansas State University. He would work as a basketball coach for the next 61 years.

In 1952, Winter began a two-year stint as head coach at Marquette University, becoming the youngest coach in major college basketball. In 1954 Winter returned to Kansas State. Winter served as Kansas State's head coach for the following 15 years, posting a 261-118 (.689) record.  He still owns the record for most league titles (eight) in school history and twice led the Wildcats to the Final Four (1958 and 1964).  Winter guided K-State to postseason play seven times overall, including six trips to the NCAA Tournament, and boasts one of the highest winning percentages in K-State's history.

Winter was named UPI National Coach of the Year in 1958 after he led Kansas State to the Final Four by knocking off Oscar Robertson and second-ranked Cincinnati in an 83-80 double-overtime thriller.  Junior center Bob Boozer was one of three Wildcats to be named a first team All-America, along with teammates Jack Parr and Roy DeWitz.  K-State advanced to their fourth Final Four in 1964.  Winter's Wildcats knocked off Texas Western and Wichita State to reach Municipal Auditorium in Kansas City, Missouri.  Two-time Big Eight selection Willie Murrell averaged 25.3 points per game during the run, which ended in a 90-82 loss to eventual national champion UCLA.

In 1962, Winter also wrote the book, entitled The Triple-Post Offense, on the triangle offense – the offense which he utilized with such success at Kansas State. Following his leaving Kansas State to his assistant Cotton Fitzsimmons, Winter also served as head coach at the University of Washington (1968-1971, where he was hired by then Athletic Director Joseph Kearney), Northwestern University (1973-1978), and Long Beach State. In 1982, LSU's Dale Brown, who Winter befriended when Brown was a high school coach, hired him as an assistant for one year 1983-84. In 30 years as a college head coach, Winter compiled a career record of 453–334.

Professional coaching

Winter was hired by Pete Newell as head coach of the Houston Rockets for two seasons, 1971–1973, posting a 51–78 record. He was fired and replaced by assistant coach Johnny Egan on January 21, 1973. The trading of Elvin Hayes to the Baltimore Bullets prior to the 1972–73 season and the Rockets' subsequent subpar performance were factors in his dismissal.

In 1985, Winter started another chapter of his life after contemplating retirement, serving as an assistant coach with the Chicago Bulls, and teaching the triangle offense to Michael Jordan.  He was hired to the position by General Manager Jerry Krause, an old friend he had met while at Kansas State.  As an assistant to Phil Jackson, who took over as the Bulls' head coach in 1989, Winter and his ball-movement offense were an integral part of the Bulls' NBA championships in 1991, 1992, 1993, 1996, 1997, and 1998.  Winter followed Jackson to the Los Angeles Lakers. Led by Shaquille O'Neal and Kobe Bryant, the Lakers won three championships using the triangle system in 2000, 2001, and 2002.  Winter was also a consultant for the NBA champion 2008–09 Los Angeles Lakers team.

Health and death
On April 25, 2009, Winter suffered a stroke in Manhattan, Kansas, while attending a Kansas State basketball reunion.

He lived near Kansas State in Manhattan, Kansas with his Alzheimer's-stricken wife and son Brian. He suffered from the after-effects of his 2009 stroke, counting an uncooperative right side and nerve pain in his neck and shoulder. He has two other sons, Russ and Chris.

Winter died on October 10, 2018 at the age of 96.

Awards and honors
Winter is a member of several halls of fame, including the Kansas Sports Hall of Fame and the National Collegiate Basketball Hall of Fame, and he was awarded the John Bunn Award for lifetime achievement from the Naismith Basketball Hall of Fame. In June 2010, he was given the Chuck Daly Lifetime Achievement Award by the NBA Coaches Association.
On his eighth time on the final ballot for the Naismith Basketball Hall of Fame, it was announced on April 2, 2011, that Winter had been elected. He was formally inducted on August 12, with his Boston-based physicist son Chris giving a speech in his behalf.

On May 26, 2012, Winter was inducted into the Compton Community College Athletics Hall of Fame, under the category of Basketball.

Head coaching record

College

NBA

|-
| style="text-align:left;"|Houston
| style="text-align:left;"|
|82||34||48||.415|| style="text-align:center;"|4th in Pacific||–||–||–||–
| style="text-align:center;"|Missed Playoffs
|-
| style="text-align:left;"|Houston
| style="text-align:left;"|
|47||17||30||.362|| style="text-align:center;"|3rd in Central||–||–||–||–
| style="text-align:center;"|–
|- class="sortbottom"
| colspan="2" align="center"|Career
|129||51||78||.395|| ||–||–||–||–

Publications

See also
 List of NCAA Division I Men's Final Four appearances by coach

References

Further reading

External links
College coaching stats at Sports-Reference.com
NBA coaching stats at Basketball-Reference.com

1922 births
2018 deaths
American men's basketball players
American test pilots
Basketball coaches from Texas
Basketball players from Texas
BSN coaches
Chicago Bulls assistant coaches
College men's basketball head coaches in the United States
El Camino College Compton Center alumni
Houston Rockets head coaches
Kansas State Wildcats men's basketball coaches
Long Beach State Beach men's basketball coaches
Los Angeles Lakers assistant coaches
Marquette Golden Eagles men's basketball coaches
Military personnel from Texas
Naismith Memorial Basketball Hall of Fame inductees
National Collegiate Basketball Hall of Fame inductees
Northwestern Wildcats men's basketball coaches
Oregon State Beavers men's basketball players
People from Collingsworth County, Texas
United States Navy pilots of World War II
USC Trojans men's basketball players
Washington Huskies men's basketball coaches